The 1975 are an English pop rock band.

The 1975 may also refer to:

 The 1975 (album), or the title track, 2013
 "The 1975", a song from their 2022 album Being Funny in a Foreign Language
 "The 1975" (song), from their 2020 album Notes on a Conditional Form
 "The 1975", a song from their 2018 album A Brief Inquiry into Online Relationships
 "The 1975", a song from their 2016 album I Like It When You Sleep, for You Are So Beautiful yet So Unaware of It

See also
 1975 (disambiguation)